Stargard railway station is a railway station serving the town of Stargard, in the West Pomeranian Voivodeship, Poland. The station is located on the Poznań–Szczecin railway, Gdańsk–Stargard railway and Stargard–Godków railway. The train services are operated by PKP and Polregio.

The first train pulled by a steam locomotive from Szczecin pulled into the station on 1 May 1846. In 1848, the line towards Poznan opened and from 1856 to 1859 a connection was made to Koszalin. At the end of the nineteenth century, connections to Pila and to Kostrzyn were built.

The station was known as Stargard (Pommern) until 1945. Until 2015, the town was known as Stargard Szczeciński, the name of the station didn't change until June 2016.

Train services
The station is served by the following services:

Express Intercity services (EIC) Szczecin — Warsaw 
Intercity services Swinoujscie - Szczecin - Stargard - Krzyz - Poznan - Kutno - Warsaw - Bialystok / Lublin - Rzeszow - Przemysl
Intercity services Swinoujscie - Szczecin - Stargard - Krzyz - Poznan - Leszno - Wroclaw - Opole - Katowice - Krakow - Rzeszow - Przemysl
Intercity services Szczecin - Stargard - Krzyz - Poznan - Kutno - Lowicz - Lodz - Krakow
Intercity services Szczecin - Stargard - Krzyz - Pila - Bydgoszcz - Torun - Kutno - Lowicz - Warsaw - Lublin - Rzeszow - Przemysl
Intercity services Szczecin - Stargard - Kalisz Pomorski - Pila - Bydgoszcz
Intercity services Szczecin - Stargard - Bialogard - Koszalin - Slupsk - Lebork - Gdynia - Gdansk - Malbork - Elblag - Olsztyn - Elk - Bialystok
Regional services (R) Swinoujscie - Szczecin - Stargard - Dobiegniew - Krzyz - Wronki - Poznan
Regional services (R) Szczecin - Stargard - Bialogard - Koszalin - Slupsk
Regional services (R) Szczecin - Stargard - Kalisz Pomorski - Pila

References

 This article is based upon a translation of the Polish language version as of October 2016.

External links

Railway stations in Poland opened in 1846
Railway stations in West Pomeranian Voivodeship
Stargard County